The Tehran University Medical Journal is the first medical journal to be published by Medical Sciences sector of the University of Tehran.

The chairman of the editorial board is S.H. Emami Razavi, and the editor-in-chief is N. Behtash.

References

General medical journals
Publications established in 1942
Multilingual journals
Quarterly journals
1942 establishments in Iran